The Sri Lanka cricket team toured England in the 1988 season to play a one-match Test series against England. England won the series 1-0.

Test series summary

One Day Internationals (ODIs)

England won the Texaco Trophy 1-0.

Only ODI

External sources
 CricketArchive – tour itineraries

Annual reviews
 Playfair Cricket Annual 1989
 Wisden Cricketers' Almanack 1989

1988 in Sri Lankan cricket
1988 in English cricket
1988
International cricket competitions from 1985–86 to 1988